Summersteps Records is an independent record label located in Dunmore, Pennsylvania, United States.  Formed by Eric Schlittler and Cassie Rose Kobeski in 1996 to release their home recordings on cassette tape,  the label has grown to include other artists and to produce professional CDs and vinyl. Their premier act, Kid Icarus, was featured in Spin as artist of the day in August 2005.

Summersteps also released two tribute CDs to mysterious outsider Texas musician Jandek. The first one released in 2000 entitled Naked In The Afternoon and the second one released in 2005 entitled Down In A Mirror.  Both tribute CDs featured artists both well known and obscure doing interpretations of Jandek songs as well as songs about the Jandek experience.

Artists
 Kid Icarus
 Miss Cassie Rose and the Pickled Punks
 Amasa
 Boo Baby
 Brother JT
 Suetta
 Circles
 Crap-O-Phonic
 Das Black Milk
 Doses
 Fantasierock
 Floating Flower
 Giraffe Hair
 Lewis & Clarke
 Louch
 My Dad Is A Dinosaur
 Psychiatrone Rhonedakk
 The Green Chair
 The Marshmallow Staircase
 The SW!MS
 Tigers Jaw
 Why Did Johnny Kill?
 Youth Aflame (The Choppers)

See also 
 List of record labels

External links
 Official site

American independent record labels
Alternative rock record labels